Heysham is a coastal village in Lancashire, England, overlooking Morecambe Bay. It is a ferry port, with services to the Isle of Man and Ireland, and the site of two nuclear power stations.

Demography
Administratively, Heysham is part of the Lancaster city district, with three wards: Heysham Central (with a population of 4,397, increasing to 4,478 at the 2011 Census), Heysham North (5,477 decreasing to 5,274 at the 2011 Census) and Heysham South (6,262; increasing to 7,264 at the 2011 Census). Together they had a population of 16,136 (2001 census), and 17,016 (2011 census). These include areas beyond the village of Heysham itself, which has a population of about 6,500.

History

Of historical interest are the stone-hewn graves in the ruins of the ancient St. Patrick's Chapel, close to St Peter's Church. They are thought to date from the 11th century, and are carved from solid rock. Local legend has it that St Patrick landed here after crossing from Ireland and established the chapel. However it has been established that the chapel was built around 300 years after Patrick's death. These stone graves appear on the cover of the Black Sabbath CD, The Best of Black Sabbath.

The grounds of St Peter's Church contain many Saxon and Viking remains, and the church itself contains a Viking hogback stone. The purpose of these strange stone sculptures is the subject of much debate; they are found mainly in Northern England and also in Scotland, Wales, Ireland and a few areas of Southern England with Viking links. Heysham also has one of only three sites in Britain and Ireland that contain a pre-Roman labyrinth carving; the others are at Tintagel, Cornwall and Hollywood, Co. Wicklow, Ireland.

Many of these artefacts and their original location suggest that this was an ancient burial ground, or barrow; the area is still known locally as "The Barrows". The Barrows are the only sea-cliffs in Lancashire and contain, in a relatively small area, woodland, open grassland, sandy beaches and deep rock pools.

Heysham Heritage Centre is housed in the barn of a Longhouse in Main Street. The building is owned by the Heritage Trust for the North West, who also own the cottage part of the longhouse, 22 Main Street. The Heritage Centre is run by volunteers, most of whom belong to Heysham Heritage Association.

Community
Heysham is the terminus of the Stanlow-Heysham oil pipeline, and of a gas pipeline that originates in Morecambe field in the Irish Sea.

Industry and transport
Heysham Port started operation in 1904. There is a ferry service to the Isle of Man, as well as freight to Ireland and services for the eastern Irish Sea and Morecambe Bay gas fields. A SeaCat service to Belfast started in 1999. Some ferries connect with trains from Heysham Port railway station to Lancaster via the Morecambe Branch Line.

Heysham oil refinery was located between Heysham and Middleton and operated from 1941 to 1976.

The Bay Gateway dual carriageway opened in October 2016, connecting Heysham directly to the M6 motorway.

Notable people
The artist J. M. W. Turner visited Heysham in the 1790s when travelling throughout Britain. On a visit in August 1816, he made sketches which formed the basis of his subsequent watercolour Heysham and Cumberland Mountains (British Museum); it depicts the village with the Lakeland backdrop across Morecambe Bay.

Professional footballer David Perkins was born in Heysham.

Gallery

See also

Listed buildings in Heysham

References

External links

Villages in Lancashire
Port cities and towns of the Irish Sea
Populated coastal places in Lancashire
Unparished areas in Lancashire
Morecambe Bay
Geography of the City of Lancaster